Moscow City Duma District 40 is one of 45 constituencies in Moscow City Duma. The constituency covers parts of Western Moscow. District 40 was created in 2013, after Moscow City Duma had been expanded from 35 to 45 seats.

Members elected

Election results

2014

|-
! colspan=2 style="background-color:#E9E9E9;text-align:left;vertical-align:top;" |Candidate
! style="background-color:#E9E9E9;text-align:left;vertical-align:top;" |Party
! style="background-color:#E9E9E9;text-align:right;" |Votes
! style="background-color:#E9E9E9;text-align:right;" |%
|-
|style="background-color:"|
|align=left|Aleksandr Milyavsky (incumbent)
|align=left|United Russia
|
|51.23%
|-
|style="background-color:"|
|align=left|Vladimir Svyatoshenko
|align=left|Communist Party
|
|16.21%
|-
|style="background-color:"|
|align=left|Olga Radayeva
|align=left|Yabloko
|
|12.19%
|-
|style="background-color:"|
|align=left|Pavel Ramensky
|align=left|Liberal Democratic Party
|
|9.47%
|-
|style="background-color:"|
|align=left|Yury Pavlenkov
|align=left|A Just Russia
|
|7.26%
|-
| colspan="5" style="background-color:#E9E9E9;"|
|- style="font-weight:bold"
| colspan="3" style="text-align:left;" | Total
| 
| 100%
|-
| colspan="5" style="background-color:#E9E9E9;"|
|- style="font-weight:bold"
| colspan="4" |Source:
|
|}

2019

|-
! colspan=2 style="background-color:#E9E9E9;text-align:left;vertical-align:top;" |Candidate
! style="background-color:#E9E9E9;text-align:left;vertical-align:top;" |Party
! style="background-color:#E9E9E9;text-align:right;" |Votes
! style="background-color:#E9E9E9;text-align:right;" |%
|-
|style="background-color:"|
|align=left|Tatyana Batysheva
|align=left|Independent
|
|37.14%
|-
|style="background-color:"|
|align=left|Igor Sukhanov
|align=left|Communist Party
|
|32.77%
|-
|style="background-color:"|
|align=left|Aleksandr Mikhaylovsky
|align=left|A Just Russia
|
|10.03%
|-
|style="background-color:"|
|align=left|Sergey Geraskin
|align=left|Liberal Democratic Party
|
|7.27%
|-
|style="background-color:"|
|align=left|Sergey Moroz
|align=left|Communists of Russia
|
|5.22%
|-
|style="background-color:"|
|align=left|Sergey Matveyev
|align=left|Rodina
|
|3.66%
|-
| colspan="5" style="background-color:#E9E9E9;"|
|- style="font-weight:bold"
| colspan="3" style="text-align:left;" | Total
| 
| 100%
|-
| colspan="5" style="background-color:#E9E9E9;"|
|- style="font-weight:bold"
| colspan="4" |Source:
|
|}

Notes

References

Moscow City Duma districts